Thomas Flamank (died 27 June 1497) was a lawyer and former MP from Cornwall, who together with Michael An Gof led the Cornish rebellion of 1497, a protest against taxes imposed by Henry VII of England.

Ancestry
He was the eldest son of Richard Flamank or Flammock of Boscarne, by Johanna or Jane, daughter of Thomas Lucombe of Bodmin, and older brother of John Flamank, MP for Bodmin in 1515. Thomas Flamank himself had been MP for Bodmin in 1492. The family is of great antiquity at Bodmin, having held the manor of Nanstallon in uninterrupted succession from the fourteenth to the nineteenth century (1817). In early times the name appeared as Flandrensis, Flemang, Flammank, and in other forms Thomas Flamank married Elizabeth, daughter of John Trelawny of Menwynick, and had a daughter Joanna, wife of Peter Fauntleroy.

Life
In 1497 Henry VII was attempting to raise a subsidy in Cornwall for the despatch of an army to Scotland to punish James IV for supporting Perkin Warbeck. Michael Joseph, a blacksmith, was chosen by the people of St. Keverne to challenge the tax. When he and his followers reached Bodmin, they were joined by Thomas Flamank, whose father was one of the commissioners appointed to supervise the tax collection. Flamank argued that it was the business of the barons of the north, and of no other of the king's subjects, to defend the Scottish border, and that the tax was illegal. He suggested that the Cornishmen should march on London and present a petition to the king setting forth their grievances, and urging the punishment of Archbishop Morton and Sir Reginald Bray, and other advisers of the king who were held responsible for his action.

As the Cornishmen proceeded into Devon, they were joined by others sympathetic to their cause.  At Wells, James Tuchet, 7th Baron Audley, joined them and undertook the leadership. They marched towards London by way of Salisbury and Winchester. London was panic-stricken; but the rebels had grown disheartened by the lack of support shown them in their long march. Giles Daubeny, 8th Baron Daubeny, was directed to take the field with the forces which had been summoned for service in Scotland, a force numbering about 8,000 men.

By 16 June 1497, the Cornish army of about 9,000 had arrived at Blackheath. Daubeny was joined by the king and some of the nobles and gentry from nearby counties. The next morning battle was joined at Deptford Strand. After a fierce skirmish, Daubeny took Deptford Bridge and he and his troops moved onto the Heath. Daubeny, outdistancing his men, was taken prisoner, but soon released. Fighting continued and the Cornish found themselves surrounded. Although they fought bravely, they were a mob without artillery or cavalry against a trained and well-equipped army. The Cornish were soon put to flight.

Audley was beheaded at Tower Hill. Flamank and Joseph were hanged and beheaded at Tyburn (27 June), and their limbs exhibited in various parts of the city. Most of their followers were pardoned.

As noted in the above-mentioned vernacular history of the Cornish, when faced with being sentenced to death Thomas Flamank is recorded as having uttered the last words "Speak the Truth and only then can you be free of your chains".

Family and descendants
He married Elizabeth Trelawny and had the following issue-

 Joan Flamank, m. Peter Fauntleroy

Legacy

In 1997, the five-hundredth anniversary of the Rebellion, a commemorative march ("Keskerdh Kernow 500") was held, retracing the route of the original march from St. Keverne in Cornwall to London.  A statue depicting An Gof and Flamank was unveiled in St. Keverne and a commemorative plaque was unveiled on Blackheath Common, and another, en route, at Guildford at the location of a preliminary skirmish.

Flamank, played by John Castle, appeared as a character in the ninth episode of the 1972 BBC television series The Shadow of the Tower, which focused on the reign of Henry VII.

See also

List of topics related to Cornwall
Second Cornish Uprising of 1497
Prayer Book Rebellion

Notes

References
Francis Bacon, History of Henry VII
Thomas Gainsford, History of Perkin Warbeck, 1618, in Harleian Miscellany, 1810, xi. 422–7
John Stow, Annals, s. a. 1497
W. C. Boase and W. P. Courtney, Bibliographia Cornubiensis p. 1181
Sir John Maclean Parochial History of Trigg Minor, i. 44, 279–84, ii. 518
Richard Polwhele, History of Cornwall, iv. 53–4
William Hals, History of Cornwall, p. 24.

Attribution

External links 
Mychal Josef an Gof "The Smith"
The Battle of Deptford Bridge (Blackheath) 1497
The Cornish Rebellion
"A name perpetual and a fame permanent and immortal"
The Black Heath Rebellion
The Black Heath Rebellion, 16 June 1497
  The Flamank Family - from a personal website

1497 deaths
People from Bodmin
Military history of Cornwall
Executed Cornish people
People executed under the Tudors for treason against England
Cornish nationalism
Cornish nationalists
Year of birth unknown
15th-century English people
Medieval Cornish people
People executed by Tudor England by hanging, drawing and quartering
People executed under Henry VII of England
People executed at Tyburn
Prisoners in the Tower of London
English politicians convicted of crimes